Mahmood Monshipouri (born 1952) is an Iranian-born American educator, author, and scholar. He is a professor of international relations at San Francisco State University (SFSU).

He has a PhD (1987) from the University of Georgia. Monshipouri previously taught at his alma mater, the University of Georgia as an instructor from 1985 to 1986; as well as taught at Central Michigan University as an adjunct assistant professor from 1988 to 1993; Alma College as a professor from 1986 to 1998; and at Quinnipiac University as a professor in the Department of Political Science from 1998.

References

1952 births

Living people
San Francisco State University faculty

Iranian emigrants to the United States
Quinnipiac University faculty
Alma College faculty
Central Michigan University faculty
International relations historians